"The Hartleys" is a work of short fiction by John Cheever, first published in The New Yorker on January 22, 1949. The story was included in The Enormous Radio and Other Stories (1953), and in The Stories of John Cheever (1978).

The story centers on the winter ski vacation of the Hartley family of New York City that ends in tragedy at a New England resort.

Plot
The story unfolds at a well-appointed New England ski resort. Mr. and Mrs. Hartley have arrived from New York City with their only child, the seven-year-old Anne. The Hartleys had once enjoyed a vacation at the fictional Pemaquoddy Inn eight years previous. After a brief separation, the couple is on a quest to rekindle a formerly close relationship that is disintegrating, held together only by their daughter. Anne's conception was likely an effort by the Hartleys to preserve their marriage.

Anne is obsessively attached to her father, and becomes alternately hysterical or depressed at his absence, who senses the parental discord. An alcohol-driven outburst by Mrs. Hartley reveals the futility of the couple's escapist efforts to sustain their marriage: "Why do we have to make these trips back to places we thought we were happy? What good is it going to do? What good has it ever done?"

The trip ends in the accidental death of Anne, who is crushed in the gears of a ski slope  towing wheel.  The story closes with the Hartleys departing the resort, following the hearse that carries their dead child.

Theme
Among the stories first collected in The Enormous Radio and Other Stories (1953), "The Hartleys" is Cheever's "earliest and clearest expression of the most important theme" characterizing the volume: the doomed search for the resurrection of an idyllic past.
Literary critic Lynne Waldeland comments on Hartley's tragic quest:

Biographer Patrick Meanor notes that "The Hartleys" is "one of Cheever's most brutally sad stories and the most bitterly ironic story in the collection."

Footnotes

Sources 
 Bailey, Blake. 2009. Notes on Text in John Cheever: Collected Stories and Other Writing. The Library of America. pp.1025-1028 
Meanor, Patrick. 1995. John Cheever Revisited. Twayne Publishers, New York. 
O'Hara, James E. 1989. John Cheever: A Study of the Short Fiction. Twayne Publishers, Boston Massachusetts. Twayne Studies in Short Fiction no 9. 
Waldeland, Lynne. 1979. John Cheever. Twayne Publishers, G. K. Hall & Co., Boston, Massachusetts. 

1949 short stories
Short stories by John Cheever
Works originally published in The New Yorker